The Ekta Space is a common name for two color spaces developed by Joseph Holmes - Ekta Space PS 5 and Ektachrome Space to safely contain fine image scans of film originals generally of 24-bit color depth.

Specification
RGB working spaces are ICC profiles, which encompass a particular region of the CIE XYZ color space (and therefore also the CIE L*a*b* color space). The function of ICC profiles is to establish an equivalence between device color values, such as RGB or CMYK, and actual colors, as represented by points in one of the CIE spaces. Given two ICC profiles, e.g. one for a working space and one for a printer, image files can be converted from one to the other, with good fidelity. This is a major part of color management.

An important consideration in selecting and using a space is to avoid clipping and to ensure that conversion into future output spaces is feasible.

History
The purpose of these color spaces was to protect an image's actual colors (as scanned from film or as mapped from a color negative). One issue was handling the clipping process which is required when an out-of-range color is scanned.

J. Holmes designed Ektachrome Space in September 1997 and later its sister Ekta Space PS 5. It was the first RGB working space to be input-centric by design.

External links
All About RGB Working Spaces
Adobe RGB (1998) color image encoding

Color space